The 1887 Massachusetts gubernatorial election was held on November 8, 1887. Incumbent Republican Governor Oliver Ames was re-elected to a second term in office, defeating Democratic former U.S. Representative Henry B. Lovering.

General election

Results

See also
 1887 Massachusetts legislature

References

Governor
1887
Massachusetts
November 1887 events